The FIBA 3x3 U18 Asia Cup for Boys and Girls is the Asian edition of the FIBA Asia's FIBA 33 championship for boys and girls under the age of 18. The first tournament games were held at Bangkok, Thailand from 22 May to 24 May 2013. The Philippines and Chinese Taipei clinched the inaugural FIBA Asia 3x3 Under-18 Championship for Boys and Girls, respectively.

Results

Boys

Girls

Statistics

Medal table

References

 
Youth 3x3 basketball
Asian
Basketball competitions in Asia between national teams
3x3 basketball competitions
Recurring sporting events established in 2013
2013 establishments in Asia
3x3 Under-18 Asian Championships